Stephen Adolphe Wurm (19 August 1922 – 24 October 2001) was a Hungarian-born Australian linguist.

Early life 
Wurm was born in Budapest, the second child to the German-speaking Adolphe Wurm and the Hungarian-speaking Anna Novroczky. He was christened Istvan Adolphe Wurm. His father died before Stephen was born.

Both of his parents were multilingual, and Wurm showed an interest in languages from an early age. Attending school in Vienna and travelling to all parts of Europe during his childhood, Wurm spoke roughly nine languages by the time he reached adulthood, a gift he inherited from his father, who spoke 17. Wurm went on to master at least 50 languages.

Career
Wurm grew up stateless, unable to take the nationality of either of his parent or of his country of residence, Austria. That enabled him to avoid military service and attend university. He studied Turkic languages at the Oriental Institute in Vienna, receiving his doctorate in linguistics and social anthropology in 1944 for a dissertation on Uzbek.

In 1946, he married fellow student Helen Groger-Wurm, a specialist in African ethnography. He taught Altaic linguistics at the University of Vienna until 1951.

After reading some works by Sidney Herbert Ray, Wurm became interested in Papuan languages and began a correspondence with Arthur Capell, a lecturer in linguistics at the University of Sydney. Wurm began teaching himself Tok Pisin and Hiri Motu from books and took up a position in London.

In 1954, the Wurms moved to Australia, where Capell had organised for Wurm a post in the Anthropology Department at the University of Sydney. In 1957, the Wurms moved to Canberra, where Stephen took up a post as Senior Fellow within the Research School of Pacific and Asian Studies (RSPAS, now Coral Bell School of Asia Pacific Affairs) at the new Australian National University (ANU). The same year, the Wurms received Australian citizenship. From then on, the main focus of Wurm's research was the study of the languages of New Guinea, but he also carried out research on a number of Australian Aboriginal languages.

At the Australian National University, he was Professor of Linguistics from 1968 to 1987. He was elected fellow of the Academy of Social Sciences in Australia in 1976.

Legacy 
In tribute to the scholarship of the man, the journal Oceanic Linguistics titled an article on Wurm "Linguist Extraordinaire".

In recognition of Wurm's outstanding contribution, the Stephen Wurm Graduate Prize for Pacific Linguistic Studies was inaugurated in 2008.

Bibliography 
 
 Wurm, S.A. editor. New Guinea area languages and language study, Vol. 1, Papuan languages and the New Guinea linguistic scene. C-38. 1975. 
 Wurm, S.A. editor. New Guinea area languages and language study, Vol. 2, Austronesian languages. C-39. 1976. 
 Wurm, S.A. editor. New Guinea area languages and language study, Vol. 3, Language, culture, society, and the modern world. C-40. 1977. 
 Wurm, S.A. and Laycock, D.C. editors. Pacific linguistic studies in honour of Arthur Capell. C-13, xii + 1303 pages. Pacific Linguistics, The Australian National University, 1970. 
 Wurm, S.A. "Chapter 6: The Kiwaian Language Family". In Franklin, K. editor, The linguistic situation in the Gulf District and adjacent areas, Papua New Guinea. C-26:217-260. Pacific Linguistics, The Australian National University, 1973. 
 Wurm, S.A. editor. Australian linguistic studies. C-54, xvi + 770 pages. Pacific Linguistics, The Australian National University, 1979. 
 Wurm, S.A. Languages: Eastern, Western, and Southern Highlands, Territory of Papua and New Guinea. D-4, + 000 pages. Pacific Linguistics, The Australian National University, 1961.
 Wurm, S.A. editor. Language maps of the highlands Provinces, Papua New Guinea. D-11, iv + 24 pages. Pacific Linguistics, The Australian National University, 1978. 
 Wurm, S.A. editor. Some Endangered Languages of Papua New Guinea: Kaki Ae, Musom, and Aribwatsa. D-89, vi + 183 pages. Pacific Linguistics, The Australian National University, 1997.

See also 
 Indo-Pacific languages
 Papuan languages
 Trans–New Guinea languages
 Donald Laycock
 Arthur Capell
 William A. Foley
 Andrew Pawley
 Malcolm Ross (linguist)

References

1922 births
2001 deaths
20th-century linguists
Academic staff of the Australian National University
Fellows of the Academy of the Social Sciences in Australia
Fellows of the Australian Academy of the Humanities
Hungarian emigrants to Australia
Hungarian people of German descent
Linguists from Australia
Linguists of Australian Aboriginal languages
Linguists of Oceanic languages
Linguists of Papuan languages
Linguists of Turkic languages
Linguists of Uzbek
Paleolinguists
Writers from Budapest